Piscichnus is an ichnogenus of trace fossil.

External links
 Chuck D. Howell's Ichnogenera Photos

Trace fossils